The Quicksand War: Prelude to Vietnam is a book by Lucien Bodard published in 1967 about the First Indochina War, which it asserts to be a prelude to the Vietnam War. Originally published in 2 French volumes, L'Enlisement and L'Humiliation, it was combined into a single book and translated by Patrick O'Brian.

Lucien Bodard is one of the best-known French foreign correspondents and is an expert on Indochina; he knows the Far East as few Europeans can know it, for not only did he spend most of his working life there but he was born in Chongqing.

References

1967 non-fiction books
French non-fiction books
First Indochina War
Books about Vietnam